Isla La Ventana, or the Window, is an island in the Gulf of California, located within Bahía de los Ángeles east of the Baja California Peninsula. The island is uninhabited and is part of the Ensenada Municipality.

Biology
Isla La Ventana has three species of reptile, including Phyllodactylus nocticolus (Peninsular Leaf-toed Gecko), Sauromalus hispidus (Spiny Chuckwalla), and Uta stansburiana (Common Side-blotched Lizard).

References

http://herpatlas.sdnhm.org/places/overview/isla-la-ventana/83/1/

Islands of Baja California
Islands of the Gulf of California
Islands of Ensenada Municipality
Uninhabited islands of Mexico